The 2001–02 season was Football Club Internazionale Milano's 93rd in existence and 86th consecutive season in the top flight of Italian football.

Season overview
After a disappointing previous season, Massimo Moratti chose former Valencia coach Héctor Cúper as the coach of rebirth. Cúper managed to line-up a new team, buying players such as Toldo, Materazzi, Kallon and Ventola. Inter had a sprint-start, topping the league and passing several challenges in Europe. 2001 closed with Giuseppe Prisco's death, vicechairman since 1962.

In the second part of season, Inter showed signs of exhaustion: 1–2 home loss to Atalanta was followed, on Thursday, from European elimination. Before the last league game, against Lazio, Inter was still at the top with one point over Juventus and two over Roma. In the first half, Inter scored twice, but both goals were equalized by Lazio's Poborsky. During second half of the match, Lazio - still in race for a UEFA Cup spot - scored another two goals, eventually winning the match. Inter fell to third place, enough to qualify for next season's Champions League playoff. Lazio-Inter also marked Ronaldo's last appearance with Inter.

First-team squad
Squad at end of season.

Transfers 

<div style="float: left; width: 50%;">
{| class="wikitable" style="font-size:90%;width:99%;"
! colspan="4" | Out
|-
! width=3% | Pos.
! width=33% | Name
! width=28% | To
! width=36% | Type
|-
| MF || Andrea Pirlo || A.C. Milan || (U$17,0 million)|-
| GK || Sébastien Frey || Parma F.C.  || €21.00 million
|-
| GK || Marco Ballotta || Modena F.C. || 
|-
| DF || Laurent Blanc || Manchester United ||free 
|-
| DF || Bruno Cirillo || Lecce || co-ownership|-
| DF || Matteo Ferrari || Parma F.C.  || co-ownership|-
| DF || Fabio Macellari || Bologna F.C.  ||co-ownership|-
| MF || Cristian Brocchi ||  A.C. Milan || 
|-
| MF || Benoît Cauet || Torino F.C.  || 
|-
| MF || Vladimir Jugović || AS Monaco || 
|-

| FW || Marco Ferrante || Torino F.C. || loan ended|-
| FW || Corrado Colombo || Atalanta B.C. ||
|- 
| DF || Salvatore Fresi || Bologna ||
|-
| FW || Adrian Mutu || Hellas Verona || €2,633 million 
|-
|}
</div>

Left club during season

Reserve squadThe following players did not make an appearance for the first team.Competitions
Serie A

Results by round

Matches

Coppa Italia

Eightfinals

UEFA Cup
First roundInternazionale won 6–0 on aggregate.Second roundInternazionale won 2–1 on aggregate.Third roundInternazionale won 4–2 on aggregate.Fourth roundInternazionale won 5–3 on aggregate.Quarter-finalsInternazionale won 2–1 on aggregate.Semi-finalsFeyenoord won 3–2 on aggregate.Statistics
Appearances and goalsAs of 30 June 2002''

|-
! colspan=14 style=background:#dcdcdc; text-align:center| Players transferred out during the season

Goalscorers
{| class="wikitable sortable" style="font-size: 95%; text-align: center;"
|-
!width="7%"|No.
!width="7%"|Pos.
!width="7%"|Nation
!width="20%"|Name
!Serie A
!Coppa Italia
!UEFA Cup
!Total
|-
| 32
| FW
| 
| Christian Vieri
| 22 
| 0 
| 3 
|25 
|-
| 3
| FW
| 
| Mohamed Kallon
| 9 
| 0 
| 6 
|15 
|-
| 78
| FW
| 
| Nicola Ventola
| 4 
| 1 
| 5 
|10 
|-
| 9
| FW
| 
| Ronaldo
| 7 
| 0 
| 0 
|7 
|-
| 20
| FW
| 
| Álvaro Recoba
| 6 
| 0 
| 0 
|6 
|-
| 10
| MF
| 
| Clarence Seedorf
| 3 
| 1 
| 0 
|4 
|-
| 14
| MF
| 
| Luigi Di Biagio
| 3 
| 0 
| 1 
|4 
|-
| 4
| DF
| 
| Javier Zanetti
| 0 
| 1 
| 1 
|2 
|-
| 6
| MF
| 
| Cristiano Zanetti
| 1 
| 0 
| 1 
|2 
|-
| 23
| DF
| 
| Marco Materazzi
| 1 
| 0 
| 1 
|2 
|-
| 2
| DF
| 
| Iván Córdoba
| 1 
| 0 
| 0 
|1 
|-
| 7
| MF
| 
| Sérgio Conçeicão
| 1 
| 0 
| 0 
|1 
|-
| 11
| MF
| 
| Guly
| 0 
| 0 
| 1 
|1 
|-
| 18
| MF
| 
| Stéphane Dalmat
| 1 
| 0 
| 0 
|1 
|-
| 21
| MF
| 
| Grigorios Georgatos
| 1 
| 0 
| 0 
|1 
|-
| 24
| DF
| 
| Vratislav Greško
| 0 
| 0 
| 1 
|1 
|-
| 28
| FW
| 
| Adriano
| 1 
| 0 
| 0 
|1 
|-
| #
| colspan=3 | Own goals
| 1 
| 0 
| 0 
|1 
|-
|- bgcolor="F1F1F1" 
| colspan=4 | TOTAL
| 62 
| 3 
| 20 
| 85

References

Inter Milan seasons
Internazionale